Perry is a city in Taylor County, Florida, United States. As of 2010, the population recorded by the U.S. Census Bureau is 7,017.
It is the county seat. The city was named for Madison Perry, fourth Governor of the State of Florida and a Confederate colonel during the American Civil War.

Geography

Climate

History
In 1922, Perry was a very small town of less than 2,000 people. During this time, a murder happened and three people were hanged for the crimes. Private retribution against the suspected families and those that gave them support ensued. The Perry Massacre occurred in Perry on 14 and 15 December 1922, during which whites hung Charles Wright and attacked the black community of Perry after the murder of a white schoolteacher. On the day following Wright's lynching two more black men were shot and hanged; whites then burned the town's black school, Masonic lodge, church, amusement hall, and several families' homes. 

According to media, Perry was the first municipality in Florida to observe the eclipse within its direct path during the solar eclipse of March 7, 1970.

Firefighters battling a blaze at a natural gas plant in August 1998 were injured when an explosion ripped through the area, sending a mammoth fireball into the sky.  The flames destroyed at least six houses and several vehicles and forced the evacuation of 100 homes within two miles of the plant.  Four firefighters were hospitalized with non-life-threatening injuries.

Demographics

2020 census
Note: the US Census treats Hispanic/Latino as an ethnic category. This table excludes Latinos from the racial categories and assigns them to a separate category. Hispanics/Latinos can be of any race.

As of the 2020 United States census, there were 6,898 people, 2,572 households, and 1,856 families residing in the city.

2010 census
As of the census of 2010, there were 7,017 people, 2,661 households, and 1,828 families residing in the city. There were 3,073 housing units at an average density of  The racial makeup of the city was  55.0% White, 40.1% African American, 0.5% Native American, 1.4% Asian and 2.1% from two or more races. Hispanic or Latino people of any race were 2.2% of the population.

There were 2,661 households, out of which 33.3% had children under the age of 18 living with them, 40.4% were married couples living together, 23.8% had a female householder with no husband present, and 31.3% were non-families. 27.0% of all households were made up of individuals, and 12.4% had someone living alone who was 65 years of age or older. The average household size was 2.52 and the average family size was 3.02.

In the city, the population age was spread out, with 28.4% under the age of 18, 8.8% from 18 to 24, 26.3% from 25 to 44, 21.5% from 45 to 64, and 15.0% who were 65 years of age or older. The median age was 36 years. For every 100 females, there were 87.8 males. For every 100 females age 18 and over, there were 84.3 males.

The median income for a household in the city was $25,986, and the median income for a family was $29,602. Males had a median income of $26,595 versus $19,041 for females. The per capita income for the city was $13,845. About 23.0% of families and 28.0% of the population were below the poverty line, including 39.0% of those under age 18 and 26.7% of those age 65 or over.

Education

Students are served by the Taylor County School System. For the 2007–2008 school year, the Florida Department of Education gave the District a "B" grade, with each of its four schools earning a "B" as well.

Taylor County High School's Bulldogs were the 1977–1978 Class 3A football District 3, Region 2 and State Semi-final Champions, losing to Bartow HS in the championship game, 7–0.  The 1978–1979 football team were the District 3 champions and lost to Milton HS in the Regional championship game.  The 1980–1981 football team were the District 3 champions and Region 2 runner-up, losing to Milton HS in the Regional championship game.  The football team won 1997–1998 Class 3A State Championship. In 2010 the Bulldogs completed an undefeated football season going 10–0, claiming the district championship.

Transportation

The city is served by Perry Shuttle, a bus route operated by Big Bend Transit.

Law enforcement
The Perry Police Department (PPD) is a 24-person agency with four Patrol K-9 teams. Each handler and K-9 partner are exposed to at least 500 hours of training, and some instances, as many as 800 hours to be certified.

Notable people

 LeGarrette Blount, retired NFL running back
 Ethel Cain, singer-songwriter and artist
 Christine Falling, serial killer who murdered six children
 Saucy Santana, American rapper

References

County seats in Florida
Cities in Taylor County, Florida
Cities in Florida